The Takács Quartet is a string quartet founded in Budapest, Hungary, and now based in Boulder, Colorado, United States.

History 
In 1975, four students at the Music Academy in Budapest, Gábor Takács-Nagy (first violin), Károly Schranz (second violin), Gábor Ormai (viola), and András Fejér (cello) formed the Takács Quartet. Takács-Nagy, Ormai and Fejér had been playing trios together for several months when they met Schranz during a pickup soccer game after classes. With his immediate addition to the group, the trio became a quartet.

The quartet first received international attention in 1977, winning the First Prize and the Critics' Prize at the International String Quartet Competition in Évian-les-Bains, France. After that, the quartet won the Gold Medal at the 1979 Portsmouth and Bordeaux Competitions and First Prizes at the Budapest International String Quartet Competition in 1978 and the Bratislava Competition in 1981. The quartet made its first North American tour in 1982.

In 1983, the group decided it would be best for them and their families if they moved to the United States. A colleague offered them a position as quartet-in-residence at the University of Colorado at Boulder, and they accepted the job.

In 1993, Takács-Nagy left the group, and the British violinist Edward Dusinberre replaced him. In 1994, Ormai learned that he had incurable cancer, and was replaced by another British musician, violist Roger Tapping. Following these changes, the quartet embarked on a successful series of recordings: a cycle of all six Bartók quartets (dedicated to the memory of Ormai, who died in 1995) and a critically acclaimed complete Beethoven quartet cycle, as well as quartets by Smetana and Borodin.

In 2005, following the completion of the Beethoven cycle, Tapping retired from the group to spend more time with his family. He now teaches chamber music at the New England Conservatory. His replacement was Geraldine Walther, an American violist who until then been principal violist of the San Francisco Symphony. The quartet's members and critics remarked on how quickly she fitted into the ensemble.

Also in 2005, the quartet became associate artists at the South Bank Centre. In 2006, they released their first recording with Walther, of Schubert's Rosamunde and Death and the Maiden quartets. This was also their first recording with Hyperion Records, after switching from the Decca label.

Schranz retired from the quartet in 2018 and was replaced by University of Colorado faculty member Harumi Rhodes.

In 2019, violist Walther announced her retirement from the quartet. She was replaced in 2020 by American violist Richard O'Neill.

Current members 
Edward Dusinberre, first violin (since 1993)
Harumi Rhodes, second violin (since 2018)
Richard O'Neill, viola (since 2020)
András Fejér, cello (original member)

Past members
Gábor Takács-Nagy, first violin (1975–1993)
Gábor Ormai, viola (1975–1994)
Roger Tapping, viola (1994–2005)
Geraldine Walther, viola (2005–2020)
Károly Schranz, second violin (1975–2018)

Awards and recognition 
Grammy Award for Best Chamber Music Performance: Andrew Keener (producer), Simon Dominic Eadon (engineer) and the Takács Quartet for Beethoven: String Quartets ("Razumovsky" Op. 59, 1–3; "Harp" Op. 74) (2003)

The quartet "has been recording the complete Beethoven quartets, and their survey, now complete, stands as the most richly expressive modern account of this titanic cycle." (Alex Ross, writing in The New Yorker, February 6, 2006).

The Takács Quartet's interpretation of Bartók's six string quartets has been praised.

The quartet was nominated for a Grammy Award for Best Chamber Music Performance for its recording of Brahms's String Quartet, Op. 51, No. 2, on the Hyperion label.

In 2010, the quartet was honored for Excellence in Research and Creative Work by the Boulder Faculty Assembly at the University of Colorado.

Selected discography
 Bartók: The Six String Quartets (Decca 289 455 297-2) (1998). Gramophone Award Winner, Best Chamber Music Recording
 Beethoven: The Early Quartets: Op. 18, Nos. 1–6 (Decca 000186402) (2004)
 Beethoven: The Late Quartets: Op. 95; Op. 127; Op. 130; Op. 131; Op. 132; Op. 133; Op. 135 (Decca 000387502) (2005)
 Beethoven: The three "Rasumovsky" Quartets, Op. 59; the "Harp" Quartet, Op. 74 (Decca 470 847-2 3 DH2) (2002). Grammy Award Winner, Best Chamber Music Recording & Gramophone Award Winner, Best Chamber Music Recording
 Borodin: String Quartet No. 2 in D Major (Decca 452 239-2)
 Brahms: String Quartets Op. 51, Nos. 1 and 2 (Decca 425 526-2) (2003)
 Brahms: String Quartet, Op. 67; Piano Quintet Op. 34 with András Schiff (Decca 430 529-2)
 Chausson: Concert for piano, violin and string quartet in D major, Op. 21 with Joshua Bell and Jean-Yves Thibaudet (Decca 000444702) (2005)
 Dvořák: String Quartet Op. 96 "American"; String Quartet, Op. 105; Five Bagatelles (Decca 47430 077-2)
 Dvořák: String Quartet in E-flat Major, Op. 51; Piano Quintet in A Major, Op. 81 with Andreas Haefliger (Decca 289 66197-2) (1999)
 Haydn: String Quartets Op. 76, Nos. 1–3 (Decca 421 360-2)
 Haydn: String Quartets Op. 76, Nos. 4–6 (Decca 425 467-2)
 Haydn: String Quartets Op. 77, Nos. 1 and 2; String Quartet, Op. 103 (Decca 430 199-2)
 Mozart: String Quintet in C Major, K. 515; String Quintet in G minor, K. 516; Adagio and Fugue in C minor, K. 546 with György Pauk (Decca 430 772-2) (1993)
 Schubert: String Quartet in A minor, D. 804 Rosamunde; String Quartet in D minor D. 810 Death and the Maiden (Decca 436 843-2) (1993)
 Schubert: String Quartet in A minor, D. 804 Rosamunde; String Quartet in D minor D. 810 Death and the Maiden (Hyperion CDA67585) (2006)
 Schubert: String Quintet in C Major, D. 956 (with Miklós Perényi); Quartettsatz in C minor, D. 703 (Decca 436 324-2)
 Schubert: String Quartet in G Major D. 887; Notturno with Andreas Haefliger, (Decca 452 854-2) (2003)
 Smetana: String Quartet No. 1 in E minor "From My Life" (Decca 452 239-2) (2003)
 Smetana: String Quartet No. 1 in E minor "From My Life" & Janáček, String Quartets No. 1 ("The Kreutzer Sonata") and No. 2 ("Intimate Letters"); Hypérion A67997 (2015)

References

Selected concert reviews
Review from Wigmore Hall by Tom Service, The Guardian, 30 November 1999.
Tom Service, review from Wigmore Hall, London, July 2001. The Guardian, 6 July 2001.
Rian Evans, review from Assembly Rooms, Bath. The Guardian, 13 November 2002.
Rian Evans, review from St George's, Bristol. The Guardian, 19 May 2004.
Tom Service, review from Wigmore Hall. The Guardian, 10 May 2005.
George Hall, review from Queen Elizabeth Hall. The Guardian, 15 November 2005.
Review from Queen Elizabeth Hall by Martin Kettle, The Guardian, 26 February 2007.

External links
 
 Faculty biography at University of Colorado
 Artist page at Hyperion Records
 Artist page at Decca Music Group
 NPR: Performance Today – Live in Studio 4A

Musical groups established in 1975
Musical groups from Colorado
Grammy Award winners
Hungarian string quartets
American string quartets
Decca Records artists
1975 establishments in Hungary